Tyrone Brunson (born Calvin Tyrone Brunson; March 22, 1956 – May 25, 2013) was an American singer and musician, who played the bass guitar. One of his most successful singles was an electro-funk instrumental titled "The Smurf" (1982), which reached #14 on the Billboard R&B chart in 1983 and led to further dance records about The Smurfs.

Life and career
Calvin Tyrone Brunson was born in Washington, D.C. In his early career he played in several local groups. He was the leader of the mid-1970s funk band The Family. Later he was the bassist for the late-1970s funk band Osiris. His first single, "The Smurf", released in the UK on the Mercury Records label, entered the UK singles chart on December 25, 1982, and reached #52; it remained in the chart for 5 weeks. "The Smurf" appeared on Brunson's debut studio album, Sticky Situation. In 1983, the follow-up U.S. single, the album's title track, reached #25 on the R&B chart.

In 1984, Brunson released his second studio album, Fresh. While the title track reached #22 on the R&B chart, no other singles made a significant dent on the chart. In 1987, Brunson released his third studio album, Love Triangle, but with no successful singles, the album fizzled on the charts. Later on, Brunson was a backing vocalist, most notably for the R&B/pop trio Levert.

After leaving the music business in the 1990s, he became an IT instructor.

Tyrone Brunson died on May 25, 2013, in Washington, D.C., at the age of 57.

Discography

Albums

Singles

References

External links
 Tyrone Brunson discography at Discogs

1956 births
2013 deaths
American male pop singers
Singers from Washington, D.C.
American electronic musicians
American dance musicians
American electro musicians